The Greenspun Corporation (TGC) was a privately owned corporation that manages the Greenspun family assets.  The company was founded by Hank Greenspun and was based in Henderson, Nevada.

Subsidiaries
 American Nevada Corporation- Land development
 Greenspun Media Group- Print publications
 Las Vegas Sun- Daily print newspaper
 VEGAS.com- Travel and tourism related services
 Casino Travel and Tours- Tourism related services, subsidiary of VEGAS.com
 CTT Transportation- Limousine and motor coach services, subsidiary of VEGAS.com
 Sun Media Productions- Film and video production
 Niche Media acquired by GMG in 2007 from Jason Binn

Joint ventures
Media
KTUD-CD (VegasTV) Greenspun had 60% interest with Catalyst Investors and later defunct
 Las Vegas One: A defunct local cable news channel with Cox Cable and KLAS-TV
 Sky Mall joint project with Spire Capital and former joint venture owner

References

External links
 The Greenspun Corporation

Companies based in Henderson, Nevada
Hospitality companies of the United States
Defunct gambling companies
Defunct mass media companies of the United States
Defunct privately held companies of the United States